There are 65 listed buildings (Swedish: byggnadsminne) in Uppsala County.

Enköping Municipality

Heby Municipality

Håbo Municipality

Knivsta Municipality

Tierp Municipality

Uppsala Municipality

Backmanska huset i Uppsala

Älvkarleby Municipality

Östhammar Municipality

External links

  Bebyggelseregistret

Listed buildings in Sweden